Muhammad Amirul Adli bin Azmi (born 13 January 1996) is a Singaporean professional footballer who plays as a defender for Singapore Premier League club Geylang International and the Singapore national team.

Club career
In 2011, he made his debut for Courts Young Lions against S-league side Woodlands Wellington which he came on for Safuwan Baharudin.

International career
Amirul was first called up to the national team against Papua New Guinea and Hong Kong in 2014. He made his international debut against Papua New Guinea on 6 September 2014, replacing Afiq Yunos in the 46th minute. He got his second cap in a 2–0 win against Laos on 13 November 2014, replacing Baihakki Khaizan in the 87th minute. He then got his third cap a few days later against Cambodia in a 4–2 on 17 November 2014, replacing Safuwan Baharudin in the 90th minute. His first major senior tournament was the 2014 AFF Championship, making him the youngest player in the national team at age 18. His fourth cap came in the Singapore'a last match of the 2014 AFF Championship against Malaysia replacing Shahfiq Ghani in the 76th minute. The game ended in a 3–1 loss to Singapore and was Amirul's first international loss with the national team. He got a couple of call ups in 2015 but did not feature for the team in that year.

Career statistics

Club
. Caps and goals may not be correct.

 Young Lions are ineligible for qualification to AFC competitions in their respective leagues.
 Young Lions withdrew from the Singapore Cup and Singapore League Cup in 2011 due to scheduled participation in the 2011 AFF U-23 Youth Championship.

International

International caps

U22 International caps

U19 International caps 

Statistics accurate as of match played November 2015

Others

Singapore squad
He was selected in the Singapore national squad for The Sultan of Selangor's Cup to be held on 24 August 2019.

References 

Living people
1996 births
Singaporean footballers
Singapore international footballers
Association football defenders
Association football midfielders
Singapore Premier League players
Young Lions FC players
Footballers at the 2014 Asian Games
Competitors at the 2017 Southeast Asian Games
Singaporean people of Malay descent
Asian Games competitors for Singapore
Southeast Asian Games competitors for Singapore